USS Casper (PG-120/PF-12), a  patrol frigate, was the only ship of the United States Navy to be named for Casper, Wyoming.

Construction
Casper, originally classified as patrol gunboat, PG-120, was reclassified as a patrol frigate, PF-12, on 15 April 1943. She was laid down on 17 October 1943, under a Maritime Commission (MARCOM) contract, MC hull 1430, at the Permanente Metals Richmond Shipyard #4, Richmond, California. Casper (PF-12) was launched on 27 December 1943, sponsored by Mrs. E. J. Spaulding. She was commissioned on 31 March 1944.

Service history
Casper sailed from San Francisco, California, on 30 September 1944, for a weather patrol out of Seattle, Washington, returning to San Francisco, 6 November. From this base, she operated as plane guard, and on weather patrol, performing these vital functions between the mainland and Pearl Harbor. During the organizing conference of the United Nations at San Francisco, which began 25 April 1945, Casper made two security patrols off the Farallon Islands.

Casper cleared San Francisco, on 4 April 1946, for Charleston, South Carolina, where she was decommissioned on 16 May 1946. The patrol frigate was sold 20 May 1947.

References

Bibliography

External links  
 
hazegray.org: USS Casper

Tacoma-class frigates
World War II patrol vessels of the United States
Ships built in Richmond, California
1943 ships
World War II frigates and destroyer escorts of the United States